Operation Cocoon was an operation launched by the Special Task Force of Tamil Nadu Police to capture the forest brigand Veerappan and his associates, who were dominant in Sathyamangalam Forest in the South Indian states of Tamil Nadu, Karnataka and Kerala. The operation was headed by K. Vijay Kumar, and N. K. Senthamarai Kannan Yadava.

Veerappan was killed on the final day of the operation, 18 October 2004. Three of his associates, Sethukuli Govinda, Chandre Gowda and Sethumani, also died, and four policemen were injured.

Veerappan defied the state governments of Karnataka, Tamil Nadu and Kerala and Indian Border security paramilitary forces, and maintained a small army, which at one point numbered hundreds of people. He was wanted for killing approximately 184 people, about half of whom were police officers, including senior police and forest officials. He was also wanted for poaching about 200 elephants and smuggling ivory worth US$2,600,000 (₹16 crore) and about 10,000 tonnes of sandalwood worth approximately US$22,000,000 (₹143 crore).

The joint Special Task Force operation to capture Veerappan, was constituted in 1991 by the state governments of Tamil Nadu and Karnataka. It is considered one of the most expensive operations of its kind in Indian history, costing 1 billion over the years.

Background
Veerappan (Koose Muniswamy Veerappan, 18 January 1952 – 18 October 2004),  also called "Sandalwood Veerappan", was an Indian bandit (also called a dacoit in India) who was active for years in scrub and forest lands covering about 6,000 km2 in the states of Tamil Nadu, Karnataka and Kerala. For over a decade, Veerappan defied the state governments of Karnataka, Tamil Nadu and Kerala and Indian Border security paramilitary forces, and maintained a small army, which at one point numbered hundreds. He was wanted for killing approximately 50 people, about half of whom were police officers, including senior police and forest officials. During his video interview with Nakkeeran editor R. Gopal, he confessed to the 20 murders he committed. While his initial days of dacoity were restricted to satisfying his financial needs, his later actions included demand of release of militants from jail in exchange of the hostages.

Veerappan first came in news when he murdered Chidambaram, a forest officer who was against his illegal trade. In 1991, he shot P Srinivas, a Karnataka Deputy Conservator of Forests and beheaded him in a Kali temple. During the subsequent years, he killed tens of police officers and tribal people, whom he felt, were against his illegal trade. In 1997, he kidnapped Karnataka forest officers and after lot of negotiations with Nakkeeran editor Gopal, he released them. In the same year, he kidnapped 21 tourists, but later released them without any harm. He came to national attention when he kidnapped the Kannada actor Rajkumar during 2000.His last big crime was in 2000, when he abducted Nagapppa, a retired minister of Karnataka. Nagappa was found dead in the forest later, but Veerappan denied his killing. He was also wanted for poaching about 200 elephants and smuggling ivory worth US$2,600,000 and about 10,000 tonnes of sandalwood worth approximately US$22,000,000.

The operation

The joint Special Task Force (STF) operation to apprehend Veerappan, instituted in 1991 by the state government's  of Tamil Nadu and Karnataka, is considered one of the costliest in Indian history, consuming 1 billion over the years.

With the assistance of tribal people, officers infiltrated the enemy camp. Due to  Veerappan's extensive knowledge of the forest terrain, they planned to bring him out of the forest. According to the police summary, the operation required ten months of planning. The execution required three weeks, but the final operation lasted only 45 minutes. STF personnel infiltrated as hawkers, masons and local service staff in the villages where Veerappan was supposedly roaming. Through the years, due to aging and death, his troop was reduced to four men. Veerapan was planning to travel to South Arcot, to receive medical treatment for his eye, and needed to leave the forest.

On the day of the operation, Veerapan was escorted out of the forest to an ambulance stationed at Papirappati village in Dharmapuri district. This was actually a police vehicle, and he was accompanied by an officer who had infiltrated his gang. A force of thirty-five officers were stationed in the village, and some men were hiding in security tankers in the road and others were hiding in the bushes. The driver of the ambulance, who was also a policeman, made an escape, as was planned. According to the report, Veerappan and his men were first warned and then asked to surrender. They refused to do so, and opened fire at the STF personnel. The STF retaliated with grenades and gun fire. Veerappan was killed in the firefight, and his fellows died in the ambulance which was transporting them to the government hospital.

After the operation, the STF recovered 12 bore Remington pump action gun, two AK-47, a self-loading rifle, two hand grenades and cash worth 3.5 lakhs. 
The file photograph released by the police showed three bullet wounds, on his forehead, hip and ribs. His body was kept in the Dharampuri hospital. Scores of people attempted to view his body, but this was not permitted. Police found it difficult to control the crowd outside the hospital. There was a brief controversy about the burial, as Veerappan's wife, Muthulakshmi, did not favor a cremation. She wanted the body to be placed in the house of Veerappan's brother. It was also asserted the choice and decision regarding the performance of the final rites rested with the family.

Controversies

The operation that killed Veerappan raised various controversies. It was alleged that the person who was killed in the encounter was not Veerappan, because as he used to have a bigger mustache. Police established his identity with fingerprints and also with confirmation with his relatives.

The gunshots were alleged to mismatch the version reported by the police involved in the encounter. However, the post mortem and ballistic expert's reports confirmed the police reports. Some media outlets claimed that Veerappan could have been captured alive and that he was killed for political reasons. They claimed that capturing him alive and subjecting him to trial might have revealed unpleasant truths. But it was clarified by the police that they were fired upon, and had to protect themselves. Four officers were wounded in the exchange of gunfire. Some protests were made by human rights activists, who felt that Veerappan was not given a fair chance to justify himself.

Aftermath
Jungle Lodges and Resorts Limited, a Karnataka government undertaking, launched 11 new jungle camps during 2010, with one of them covering Gopinatham, where Veerappan lived. The tourism involved  trek through the vast BR and MM hills and a narration of the places where Veerapan lived and held people in hostage by a trained local guide. K. Vijay Kumar was awarded the President's gallantry medal in 2005 for the operation.

In 2016, K. Vijay Kumar announced that he was writing a book penning down his first hand account of the operation. After the operation, Kumar became the Chief of the CRPF and currently serves as Senior Security Advisor to the Home Ministry of India. Kumar said that he would not reveal any names in the book, but rather would focus on incidents that had led to the killing of Veerappan.

Popular culture
The operation inspired several fictional works. A 125 episode tele-serial named Santhanakadu, was telecast on Makkal TV in 2007 and was controversial. Veerappan's widow, Muthulakshmi, filed a case in a sessions court stating that the telecast would demean her family. She lost the case.

In 2012, A. M. R. Ramesh directed the Kannada film Attahasa. In 2016, Ram Gopal Varma directed the Kannada film, Killing Veerappan, and a Bollywood sub-version Veerappan highlighting the role of K Vijay Kumar, and N. K. Senthamarai Kannan in the operation.

References

2000s in Tamil Nadu
2004 in India
Crime in Tamil Nadu
October 2004 events in India
2004 crimes in India
Illegal logging in India
Tamil Nadu Police
Encounters in India
Law enforcement operations in India